Pennsylvania Route 215 (PA 215) is a  state highway located in western Erie County, Pennsylvania.  The southern terminus is at U.S. Route 6N (US 6N) near Albion.  The northern terminus is at PA 5 in Springfield Township.

Route description

PA 215 begins at an intersection with US 6N in Conneaut Township, Erie County, heading north on two-lane undivided Kidders Corner Road. The road runs through agricultural areas with some homes, turning northeast and crossing the wooded Conneaut Creek into Springfield Township. In this area, the route becomes Summerville Road and runs north through a mix of farmland and woodland with occasional residences, crossing the Canadian National's Bessemer Subdivision railroad line at-grade. Farther north, PA 215 comes to a diamond interchange with I-90. After this, the route heads through more rural areas as an unnamed road and reaches the residential community of East Springfield. In this area, the road comes to an intersection with US 20. PA 215 heads north through more farmland with some homes, becoming Academy Street. The route makes a turn to the west-northwest onto an unnamed road and crosses Norfolk Southern's Lake Erie District railroad line at-grade. The road runs through a mix of farm fields and woods with a few residences, turning to the north. PA 215 comes to its northern terminus at an intersection with PA 5.

Major intersections

See also

References

External links

Pennsylvania Highways: PA 215

215
Transportation in Erie County, Pennsylvania